The Wad Habuba Revolt was an uprising in Anglo-Egyptian Sudan in mid-1908. Its causes laid in religious opposition to Christian British rule in Sudan, and a desire to restore the Mahdist State. It was led by a veteran of the Mahdist War, Abd al-Qadir Muhammad Imam Wad Habuba. It began in April, when al-Qadir took over the town of Tugur with 40 followers. From there, the rebellion spread to Katfia. Colonial authorities took the revolt very seriously and dispatched 2 infantry companies to quell the uprising. By the end of April, Katfia had been bloodlessly recaptured. On the night of 2 May, the rebels attempted to retake Katfia from the British, but were unsuccessful, and suffered 35 killed in this battle, while the British forces, led by Ernest Arthur Dickinson (b. 1864, Governor of Blue Nile province 1905-1914) suffered 17 killed and wounded. By 3 May, the revolt had ended and al-Qadir had left for Omdurman on a donkey.

References 

African resistance to colonialism
Wars involving the United Kingdom
Wars involving Sudan
Wars involving the states and peoples of Africa
20th-century military history of the United Kingdom
Wars involving Egypt
Rebellions in Africa
Conflicts in 1908
1908 in Sudan